Torch Lake Township is the name of some places in the U.S. state of Michigan:

 Torch Lake Township, Antrim County, Michigan
 Torch Lake Township, Houghton County, Michigan

Michigan township disambiguation pages